The Quinton Township School District is a comprehensive community public school district that serves students in kindergarten through eighth grade from Quinton Township in Salem County, New Jersey, United States.

As of the 2018–19 school year, the district, comprised of one school, had an enrollment of 311 students and 28.5 classroom teachers (on an FTE basis), for a student–teacher ratio of 10.9:1.

The district is classified by the New Jersey Department of Education as being in District Factor Group "A", the lowest of eight groupings. District Factor Groups organize districts statewide to allow comparison by common socioeconomic characteristics of the local districts. From lowest socioeconomic status to highest, the categories are A, B, CD, DE, FG, GH, I and J.

Public school students in ninth through twelfth grades attend Salem High School in Salem City, together with students from Elsinboro Township, Lower Alloways Creek Township and Mannington Township, as part of a sending/receiving relationship with the Salem City School District. As of the 2018–19 school year, the high school had an enrollment of 374 students and 44.0 classroom teachers (on an FTE basis), for a student–teacher ratio of 8.5:1.

Schools
Schools in the district (with 2018–19 enrollment data from the National Center for Education Statistics) are:
Elementary school
Quinton Township Elementary School (306 students in grades PreK-8)
Mindy Bacon, Principal

Administration
Core members of the district's administration are:
Stewart G. Potter Jr., Superintendent
Karen Mathews, Business Administrator / Board Secretary

Board of education
The district's board of education, comprised of nine members, sets policy and oversees the fiscal and educational operation of the district through its administration. As a Type II school district, the board's trustees are elected directly by voters to serve three-year terms of office on a staggered basis, with three seats up for election each year held (since 2012) as part of the November general election. The board appoints a superintendent to oversee the day-to-day operation of the district.

References

External links
Quinton Township School District

School Data for the Quinton Township School District, National Center for Education Statistics

New Jersey District Factor Group A
Quinton Township, New Jersey
School districts in Salem County, New Jersey
Public K–8 schools in New Jersey